The Portland Fish Pier is a fishing pier located in Portland, Maine on the edge of the Fore River. A fishermen's memorial is also located at the Pier.

Due to the heavy commercial fishing industry presence, there is no ferry service at the Portland Fish Pier. Instead, the Casco Bay Ferry arrives and departs from the nearby Maine State Pier.

External links
Portland Fish Exchange official website

Economy of Portland, Maine
Piers in Maine
Buildings and structures in Portland, Maine
Port of Portland (Maine)